Frau Musica (nova) was a conference held in November 1998 at the Musikhochschule (music conservatory) in Cologne, focusing on historical and living women composers.  The conference consisted of both academic paper sessions and concerts, including a newly commissioned work by Pauline Oliveros.

References

Women composers